The Nivelles Carnival is one of the most important carnivals in Belgium. It is the oldest carnival in the province of Walloon Brabant. It welcomes a lot of floats, traditional groups, majorettes, fanfares and giants. The carnival is mainly famous for its societies of Gilles and its imaginative societies which attract crowds as in the nearby Centre region, Hainaut (binchois type of carnival). It lasts four days and takes place on the weekend of Quadragesima Sunday. It starts the first Saturday of Lent and ends the following Tuesday.

History
The Nivelles Carnival started before the 1900s. It initially took place around Laetare Sunday and later moved to the first weekend of Lent. It is not known exactly when Gilles made their first appearance (around 1910).

References

Carnivals in Belgium
Spring (season) events in Belgium